The France Info Prize for news and reporting comics  (French: prix France Info de la Bande dessinée d’actualité et de reportage) is a comic book prize awarded annually by the French public radio station France Info. The jury of the station's journalists chooses from a selection of about ten albums.

Origins 
Jean-Christophe Ogier, host of a radio program about comics at France Info, is the founder and organizer of the award since 1994. The award is given each year in the run-up to the Angoulême International Comics Festival in January. The jury is formed by nine radio journalists presided by the director of France Info.

Award winners 
Honors, :

 1994 : La Fille aux Ibis, by Christian Lax and  Frank Giroud, Dupuis. 
 1995 : L'Homme qui fait le tour du monde by Pierre Christin, Max Cabanes and Philippe Aymond, Dargaud. 
 1997 : Chiens de fusil, by Christian Lax, Vents d'Ouest. 
 1998 : Fax de Sarajevo, by Joe Kubert, Vertige Graphic. 
 1999 : Palestine, t. 1 : Une nation occupée, dby Joe Sacco, Vertige Graphic.
 2000 : Passage en douce. Carnet d'errance, by Helena Klakočar, Fréon. 
 2001 : Déogratias, by Jean-Philippe Stassen, Dupuis. 
 2002 : Persepolis, t. 2, by Marjane Satrapi, L'Association. 
 2003 : Carnets d'Orient, t. 6, La Guerre fantôme, Jacques Ferrandez, Casterman. 
 2004 : Soupe froide, Charles Masson, Casterman. 
 2005 : Le Photographe, t. 2, by Emmanuel Guibert, Didier Lefèvre and  Frédéric Lemercier, Dupuis, coll. « Aire Libre ». 
 2006 : Les Mauvaises Gens, by Étienne Davodeau, Delcourt, coll. « Encrages ». 
 2007 : Un homme est mort, by Étienne Davodeau and  Kris, Futuropolis. 
 2008 : Exit Wounds, by  Rutu Modan, Actes Sud BD. 
 2009 : Le Procès Colonna, by Tignous and Dominique Paganelli, 12 bis. 
 2010 : L’Affaire des affaires, t. 1 L'argent invisible, by Denis Robert, Yan Lindingre and Laurent Astier, Dargaud. 
 2011 : Gaza 1956.En marge de l'Histoire, by Joe Sacco, Futuropolis. 
 2012 : En cuisine avec Alain Passard, by Christophe Blain, Gallimard. 
 2013 : La voiture d'Intisar: portrait d'une femme moderne au Yémen by Pedro Riera and Nacho Casanova, Delcourt. 
 2014 : Ainsi se tut Zarathoustra, by Nicolas Wild, La Boîte à bulles / ARTE Éditions. 
 2015 : La Lune est blanche, by Emmanuel Lepage and François Lepage, Futuropolis,. 
 2016 : Catharsis, Luz, Futuropolis. 
 2017 : Love story à l'iranienne, by  Jane Deuxard and Zac Deloupy, Delcourt. 
 2018 : Brigade des mineurs: immersion au cœur de la brigade de protection des mineurs, de Raynal Pellicer and Titwane, Éditions de la Martinière. 
 2019 : Indélébiles by Luz, Futuropolis. 
 2020 : Les Racines de la colère by Vincent Jarousseau and Eddy Vaccaro, Les Arènes
 2021 : L'Odyssée d'Hakim, t. 3 : De la Macédoine à la France, by Fabien Toulmé, éd. Delcourt
 2022 : La Cellule, enquête sur les attentats du 13 novembre 2015 by Soren Seelow, Kévin Jackson and Nicolas Otéro, éd. Les Arènes

References 

Comics awards
1994 establishments in France